The 11th Reconnaissance Squadron is an active United States Air Force Unit, originally constituted as the 11th Observation Squadron in February 1942.  It has held this designation since July 1995.

11th Reconnaissance Squadron may also refer to:
 The 524th Special Operations Squadron, designated the 11th Reconnaissance Squadron (Light) from January 1941 to August 1941
 The 701st Tactical Air Support Squadron, designated the 11th Reconnaissance Squadron (Heavy) for seven days in 1942.

See also
 The 11th Tactical Reconnaissance Squadron